Tommy Clarence Engstrand (30 September 1939 – 18 July 2021) was a Swedish sports journalist, and television host of general interest shows like Razzel and Zick-Zack.

Biography
Engstrand provided commentary on the FIFA World Cup 1978 final between Argentina and the Netherlands (3–1 after extra-time) for the only Swedish television company at that time, Sveriges Radio. He and Björn Borg became personal friends. Within sports, his radio commentary of the last minutes of the World-Cup qualifier between West Germany and Portugal on 16 October 1985, which ended with a single goal win for Portugal, is a bit of Swedish radio history, because the result meant that Portugal went ahead for the FIFA World Cup 1986 instead of Sweden. With two minutes left, he declared whilst close to crying "Portugal is leading 1–0, and I can't give you any hope". Sweden had earlier that day taken the lead by 1–0 against Czechoslovakia away, but lost 2–1; however, the hope was still alive, if only West Germany (that by this time had not lost any such game, and was playing at home) just took a single point, that would have been enough; but West Germany did not. The event became known as "Den svarta onsdagen" in Sweden ("The Black Wednesday").

Tommy Engstrand died in 2021 in Stockholm from complications of Chronic obstructive pulmonary disease.

References

1939 births
2021 deaths
Swedish sports broadcasters
Swedish television hosts
Journalists from Stockholm
Deaths from pulmonary edema